The Spit Nature Conservation Reserve is a 300 ha nature reserve on the north-western shore of Port Phillip, a large bay in Victoria, Australia. It consists of public land set aside to conserve and protect species, communities, and habitats of indigenous plants and animals. It is adjacent to the Werribee Sewage Farm and is managed by Parks Victoria.

Description
The reserve contains sand spits, a lagoon, and an area of saltmarsh. Together the north and south spits are approximately four kilometres long and vary in shape and size depending on the tide and, over longer periods of time, the onshore currents. At high tide, the depth of the lagoon reaches about one metre, while at low tide a mudflat is exposed. This environment provides an area which is an extremely important feeding ground for a variety of birds, especially waders and waterbirds. The saltmarsh is important as one of the main wintering sites for the critically endangered orange-bellied parrot.

Values
The reserve is listed as a wetland of international importance under the Ramsar Convention as part of the Port Phillip Bay (Western Shoreline) and Bellarine Peninsula Ramsar Site. Other international treaties covering the reserve and its birdlife include the China–Australia Migratory Bird Agreement, the Japan–Australia Migratory Bird Agreement, and the Bonn Convention. The reserve is part of the Werribee and Avalon Important Bird Area, identified as such by BirdLife International because of its importance for wetland and waterbirds as well as for orange-bellied parrots.

Access
The only way to approach the reserve by land is through the Werribee Sewage Farm.  There is no general public access to the reserve, though visitors with birdwatching permits to the sewage farm can observe the birdlife from the boundary.

References

Notes

Sources
 

Nature Conservation Reserves of Victoria (Australia)
Birdwatching sites in Australia
Ramsar sites in Australia
Port Phillip
Important Bird Areas of Victoria (Australia)
City of Greater Geelong